Seo Young-jae (born 23 May 1995) is a South Korean professional footballer who plays as a left-back for Daejeon Hana Citizen.

Club career
After moving to MSV Duisburg in the summer of 2018, he moved to Holstein Kiel for the 2019–20 season.

International career
Seo was included in South Korea's squad for the 2014 edition of the AFC U-19 Championship in Myanmar, but did not make an appearance in the tournament. The following year, he was included in South Korea's squad for the football tournament at the 2015 Summer Universiade in Gwangju, South Korea. In the group stage, Seo opened the scoring in the 18th minute against Canada, which finished as a 3–1 win for South Korea. Overall, he scored one goal in five appearances, with South Korea finishing as runners-up after losing 0–3 to Italy in the Gold medal match.

Seo also appeared for South Korea's under-23 team, appearing seven times from 2015 to 2016.

Honours
South Korea Universiade
Summer Universiade silver medal: 2015

References

External links

1995 births
Living people
People from Wonju
South Korean footballers
South Korea under-23 international footballers
South Korean expatriate footballers
South Korean expatriate sportspeople in Germany
Expatriate footballers in Germany
Association football fullbacks
Hanyang University alumni
Hamburger SV II players
MSV Duisburg players
Holstein Kiel players
Daejeon Hana Citizen FC players
2. Bundesliga players
Regionalliga players
Universiade silver medalists for South Korea
Universiade medalists in football
Sportspeople from Gangwon Province, South Korea